The 2020 PGA Tour Canada, titled as the 2020 Mackenzie Tour – PGA Tour Canada for sponsorship reasons and commonly known as the Canadian Tour, was scheduled to be the 51st season of the PGA Tour Canada. It would have been the eighth season under the operation of the PGA Tour and the final year of the initial six year sponsorship deal with Mackenzie Investments.

In early March, the tour's four remaining qualifying tournaments were postponed due to the COVID-19 pandemic. On April 16, it was announced that the first six tournaments would also be postponed. On May 29, the tour announced the cancellation of the entire season.

With the cancellation of the season, the PGA Tour created an eight tournament LocaliQ Series based in the United States in which tour members, along with those of the suspended 2020 PGA Tour Latinoamérica and cancelled 2020 PGA Tour China, would be eligible to compete. In addition, four tournaments, the Canada Life Series, were played in Canada in August and September to provide Canadian-based players some playing opportunities.

All regular season events were planned to have a purse of $200,000 except and the final event of the season, the Canada Life Championship, having a purse of $225,000.

Schedule
The following table lists official events during the 2020 season.

Canada Life Series
A series of four 54-hole tournaments was organised in August and September.

References

External links
PGA Tour Canada official site

PGA Tour Canada
PGA Tour Canada